Half Hour of Power is the debut extended play by Canadian rock band Sum 41. It was released on June 27, 2000 on Big Rig Records, a subsidiary of Island Records (United States), and Aquarius Records (Canada). The cover features the band's then-drummer Steve Jocz aiming a Nerf gun up in the air and standing in front of an explosion in the background. Though officially an EP, Half Hour of Power may also be considered the band's debut studio album. Most of the songs featured on the EP were included as bonus tracks on Sum 41's actual debut studio album All Killer No Filler, which featured a re-recorded version of Half Hour of Power'''s sixth track "Summer". This is the second of three times that this song was featured on a Sum 41 album. It first appeared on their 1998 demo tape. The group originally planned to include different versions of the song on each of their albums as a joke, but scrapped the idea after All Killer No Filler'', as they felt that it would annoy their fanbase.

Music
Considered punk rock, skate punk and pop punk, the EP also uses elements of other genres as well. The songs "Grab the Devil by the Horns and Fuck Him Up the Ass" and "Ride the Chariot to the Devil", are considered as heavy metal, both being compared to the band Iron Maiden. Although "Another Time Around" was described as punk rock, the song's intro was described as "dirge-metal". The song "Second Chance for Max Headroom" sounds like the band NOFX and is known for having a ska part. The song "Dave's Possessed Hair/It's What We're All About" is known for having a part with elements of hip hop music. Elements of hardcore punk are also featured on the EP. Described as Oi!, the track "T.H.T." is considered the most punk rock track on the EP.

Critical reception 
Curtis Zimmermann of AllMusic stated that "The first track, "Grab the Devil by the Horns and Fuck Him up the Ass," is a time warp. For a minute and a half the group relives the new wave of British metal and cranks out an Iron Maiden style tune. After a brief trip down memory lane the album quickly morphs into pop punk. The songs are well crafted and the hooks are catchy on "Make No Difference" and "Summer." But in some respects that is problematic, there was a time in the pre-Green Day/Blink 182 years where punk defined itself by not being radio friendly. A good album, but essentially proof that turn of the millennium punk is just as much a corporate rock entity as adult contemporary."

Track listing

Personnel
Adapted from the EP's liner notes.

Sum 41
Deryck "Bizzy D" Whibley – lead vocals, guitar, rapping on "Dave's Possessed Hair/It's What We're All About"
Dave "Hot Chocolate" Baksh - guitar, backing vocals, rapping on "Dave's Possessed Hair/It's What We're All About"
Jason "Cone" McCaslin – bass, backing vocals
Steve "Stevo 32" Jocz – drums, percussion, rapping on "Dave's Possessed Hair/It's What We're All About"

Additional musicians
Sarah McElcheran, Steven Donald - horns on "Second Chance for Max Headroom"
MC Shan - vocals on "It's What We're All About"

Charts

Notes

References

External links

Half Hour of Power at YouTube (streamed copy where licensed)

2000 debut EPs
Sum 41 albums
Pop punk EPs
Skate punk EPs
Punk rock EPs
Albums produced by Greig Nori
Aquarius Records (Canada) EPs